David William Silk (Butte, Montana, October 18, 1965) is a former all-round speed skater from the United States who was active from 1983 to 1990. He finished third at the 1988 World Allround Speed Skating Championships, and was a World Cup winner in 1985-86 in the 5,000/10,000 category. He competed in three events at the 1988 Winter Olympics.

References

External links
Dave Silk, records in Jakub Majerski's database
Dave Silk, results in schaatsstatistieken.nl

1965 births
Living people
American male speed skaters
Olympic speed skaters of the United States
Sportspeople from Butte, Montana
World Allround Speed Skating Championships medalists
Speed skaters at the 1988 Winter Olympics